Schlitterbahn Waterpark Kansas City was a water park that opened on July 15, 2009 in Kansas City, Kansas. It was announced in September 2005 by Schlitterbahn Waterparks. The , $750 million development included a nearly  waterpark, which is Schlitterbahn's fourth waterpark and its first outside Texas.

Groundbreaking took place September 18, 2007 on the land formerly occupied by the Wyandotte County Fairgrounds and the Unified Government courthouse annex, across Interstate 435 from the Kansas Speedway and Village West.

History
Phase 1 included the opening of 12 water attractions, 3 restaurants, and 2 shops. Of those attractions, three were purchased from the former Geauga Lake amusement park in Ohio. Phase 2, named Schlitterbahn Vacation Village Resort was originally planned to include over 1,000 hotel rooms, a Scheels sporting goods store, and a Riverwalk area consisting of shops and restaurants on 300 acres surrounding the water park. Those plans were stalled and eventually abandoned due to the ongoing Great Recession. An expansion of the water park opened on April 30, 2011, with six new attractions.

Verrückt and accident

In November 2012, Schlitterbahn Waterparks announced plans for the world's tallest and fastest water slide, Verrückt. Designed by Schlitterbahn co-owner Jeff Henry, Verrückt was a three-person raft slide with an uphill section. The initial drop was a 17-story plunge with a five-story uphill section. It opened on July 10, 2014, after multiple delays.

In August 2016, 10-year old Caleb Schwab was killed while riding Verrückt. The death occurred when the raft he was in went airborne at the lower bump and struck a metal support of the netting, decapitating him. The other two passengers, both women, were injured in the incident — one suffered a broken jaw, while the other suffered a facial bone fracture and needed stitches. In the immediate aftermath, the park was closed pending an inspection. Although the park reopened three days later, the ride remained closed.

Their findings revealed that the use of the metal brace and netting system in the design, along with the use of hook and loop straps to restrain the riders, went against guidelines set by ASTM F-24 Committee on Amusement Ride and Devices. According to the guidelines, Verrückt should have incorporated the use of a rigid over-the-shoulder restraint for riders, and an upstop mechanism to prevent the rafts from going airborne.

Aftermath
In 2018, the last operating season of the park, four attractions remained closed throughout the season after an audit by regulators found that each did not comply with the Kansas Amusement Ride Act.

Demolition of Verrückt began on November 1, 2018. The park did not open for the 2019 season.

On June 13, 2019, Cedar Fair agreed to buy Schlitterbahn's two parks in New Braunfels and Galveston for a price of $261 million. Additionally, Cedar Fair had the option for up to 120 days to buy the Kansas City location "for an additional $6 million". Cedar Fair did not pursue purchasing the property within those 120 days and the park remained standing but not operating.

On November 6, 2020, Homefield LLC signed an agreement with the Unified Government of Wyandotte County and Kansas City, Kansas to fund the redevelopment of the former Schlitterbahn lot for $90 million into an amateur sports complex. Plans called for the total demolition of the remaining Schlitterbahn structures, which was to begin before July 2021. The adjacent Wyandotte County Courthouse Annex building was demolished beginning in February 2021, and the demolition of Schlitterbahn itself was completed before September.

References

External links

Water parks in Kansas
Buildings and structures in Kansas City, Kansas
Tourist attractions in Wyandotte County, Kansas
2009 establishments in Kansas
2018 disestablishments in Kansas
Defunct amusement parks in the United States
Amusement parks closed in 2018